This is a list of brands of vodka. Vodka is a distilled beverage composed primarily of water and ethanol, sometimes with traces of impurities and flavorings. Vodka is made by the distillation of fermented substances such as grains, potatoes, or sometimes fruits or sugar. The classic preparation is performed using grain or potatoes. The grains or potatoes based vodka has a neutral flavor profile.


See also

 List of alcoholic beverages
 List of cocktails
 List of liqueurs
 List of national liquors
 List of whisky brands

References

External links
 

Vodkas
Vodka
Vodka